Strong as Steel is the second studio album by Australian pop singer Tina Arena, released in 1990 by EMI.

Album information
The album has a very light tone and a pop rock feel to it compared to Arena's subsequent albums, which were darker and more personal.

Strong as Steel was re-released in 1996 by Sony Music, however the re-release is substantially different from the original version. The cover art for the re-release is completely different and only five of the thirteen tracks from the original version are included. Five previously unreleased songs (including a demo destined for her next studio effort) recorded at a later date were added for a total of ten tracks on the new version. The uniqueness and rarity of the original 1990 version has made it a highly sought after collector's item.

Track listing

Production
Producers: Tina Arena, Doug Brady, Ross Inglis, Pam Reswick, Steve Werfel
Art direction: Pierre Baroni
Design: Pierre Baroni
Photography: Pierre Baroni

Charts

References

1990 debut albums
Tina Arena albums
EMI Records albums
Disco albums by Australian artists